Quincy may refer to:

People
Quincy (name), including a list of people with the name Quincy
Quincy political family, including members of the family

Places and jurisdictions

France
Quincy, Cher, a commune in the Cher département
 A hamlet of Chilly in the Haute-Savoie département
 A former commune in the Seine-et-Marne département, now part of Quincy-Voisins

United States
Quincy, California
Quincy, Florida
Quincy, Illinois
Quincy University, located in Quincy, Illinois
the former Roman Catholic Diocese of Quincy, now a Latin titular see 
Quincy, Indiana
Quincy, Iowa
Quincy, Kansas
Quincy, Kentucky
Quincy, Massachusetts, the first Quincy in the United States
Quincy, Michigan
Quincy, Mississippi
Quincy, Missouri
Quincy, Ohio
Quincy, Oregon
Quincy, Pennsylvania
Quincy, Washington
Quincy, West Virginia, in Kanawha County
Quincy, Wisconsin, a town
Quincy (ghost town), Wisconsin, a ghost town
Quincy Hollow, a section of Levittown, Pennsylvania
Quincy Township (disambiguation)

Structures

United States
 Quincy (CTA), a station on the Chicago Transit Authority's 'L' system
 Quincy House (disambiguation), several places
 Josiah Quincy House, a historical landmark in Quincy, Massachusetts built and owned by a Josiah Quincy
 Josiah Quincy Mansion, former mansion in Wollaston Park, Quincy, Massachusetts, built and owned by a Josiah Quincy
 Quincy Homestead, the Dorothy Quincy House and remaining homestead of the Quincy family
 Quincy Market, a historic building in the Faneuil Hall Marketplace shopping center in Boston, Massachusetts

Singapore
 The Quincy Hotel, a 108 luxury hotel in Singapore managed by Far East Hospitality

Ships
 USS Quincy, the name of several ships

In pop culture
 Quincy (film), a 2018 American documentary film
 Quincy, M.E., an American television series starring Jack Klugman as Dr. Quincy
 Quincy (Bleach), the race of Hollow-slayers who utilize spiritual power in the anime and manga, Bleach
 "Quincy / Kono Yo no Shirushi", a single by Korean singer BoA
 Quincy (band), a new wave power pop band from New Jersey
 Quincy (comic strip), a newspaper comic strip 
 Quincy, the first name of cartoon character Mr. Magoo
 Quincy, the voracious iguana in FoxTrot
 Quincy, a fictional character from the TV series Little Einsteins

Other uses
 Quincy AOC, an Appellation d'origine contrôlée (AOC) in the Loire Valley wine region of France
 Quincy Newspapers, a media company in Quincy, Illinois
 Quincy, an alternate spelling of quinzhee, snow shelter similar to an igloo

See also

Quincey (disambiguation)
Quinsey (disambiguation)
Quinsy (disambiguation)
Quince (disambiguation)